Abel Bretones Cruz (born 21 August 2000) is a Spanish footballer who plays as either a left back or a left winger for Real Oviedo.

Club career
Born in La Felguera, Langreo, Asturias, Bretones represented UP Langreo and Alcázar CF as a youth. After making his senior debut with the farm team CD Langreo Eulalia, he made his first team debut on 9 March 2019, coming on as a late substitute for Héctor Nespral in a 1–0 Segunda División B away loss against SCD Durango.

Bretones featured regularly for Eulalia in the following years, scoring 19 goals in the 2019–20 season as the side achieved promotion to Regional Preferente and later was fully incorporated into Langreo's structure and subsequently renamed UP Langreo B. On 12 August 2021, he renewed his contract until 2023, being promoted to the main squad.

On 31 January 2022, Bretones moved to Real Oviedo and was assigned to the B-team in Tercera División RFEF. He impressed new manager Bolo during the pre-season, and made his professional debut on 21 August, his 22rd birthday, by starting in a 1–0 home win over CD Leganés in the Segunda División.

In January 2023, Bretones was definitely promoted to Oviedo's first team, being assigned the number 2 jersey.

References

External links

2000 births
Living people
People from Langreo
Spanish footballers
Footballers from Asturias
Association football defenders
Association football wingers
Segunda División players
Segunda División B players
Segunda Federación players
Tercera Federación players
Divisiones Regionales de Fútbol players
UP Langreo footballers
Real Oviedo Vetusta players
Real Oviedo players